The Nigerian Youth Movement (NYM) was Nigeria's first genuine nationalist organization, founded in Lagos at Stanley Orogun, with Professor Eyo Ita as the founding father and many others, including Samuel Akisanya.
Ernest Ikoli, the first editor of the Daily Times of Nigeria, which was launched in the month of June 1926, was another founding member.
Immediate concerns included the supposedly inferior status of Yaba College, appointments of Africans to senior positions in the civil service and discriminations against the African truck drivers.
However, the Lagos-based organization at first, has generally moderate views and pledged to support and co-operate with the governor.
The president was Dr Kofo Abayomi. Ernest Ikoli was vice president and H.O. Davies was the secretary.
It was the first multi-ethnic organization in Nigeria and its programme was to foster political advancement of the country and enhance the socio-economic status of the Nigerian citizens.
Adeyemo Alakija later became President of the NYM.

The movement acquired national outlook and became a strong national movement, when Nnamdi Azikiwe and H.O. Davies returned to Nigeria in 1937 and 1938 respectively and consequently joined the movement .
N.Y.M became the first authentic Nigerian nationalist organization to be formed in the country. Obafemi Awolowo and Samuel Akintola were other prominent members of the movement, which membership was opened  to all Nigerians, especially those that were residents  in Lagos. Today, All Nigeria Youths needs to Stand up and defend their beloved country, Nigeria, by choosing the right president, senators, governors, assembly members, both in federal and states levels , including chairmen and councilors in various LGAs, across the Federal Republic of Nigeria !

Growing Militancy
When Nnamdi Azikiwe ("Zik") launched theWest African Pilot in 1937, dedicated to fighting for independence from British colonial rule, the newspaper was an immediate success.
Zik, an Igbo man, found a ready-audience among the non-Yoruba people of Nigeria, including many in Lagos state 
He introduced Pan-African consciousness to the NYM, and expanded its membership with large numbers of people, who had previously been excluded. H.O. Davies returned to Nigeria in 1938, from a spell at the London School of Economics (LSE), becoming a leading figure in the movement, until he resigned in 1951. At the LSE, Davies had roomed with Jomo Kenyatta and had absorbed the socialist views of Harold Laski.

In October 1938, the NYM fought and won elections for the Lagos Town Council, ending the dominance of Herbert Macaulay and the National Democratic Party.
The newly self-confident members of the Nigerian Youth Movement objected to the system of indirect rule through traditional tribal leaders. The Youth Charter published in 1938 said: "We are opposed to the term "Indirect Rule" literally as well as in principle. Honest trusteeship implies direct British Rule with a view to ultimate self-government...".
The Charter set out goals of unifying the tribes of Nigeria to work towards a common ideal, and educating public opinion to develop the national consciousness needed to reach this ideal. The goal was spelled out as complete autonomy within the British Empire on a basis of equal partnership with the other member states.

References

Sources

 

1933 establishments in Nigeria
Nigerian nationalism
Defunct political parties in Nigeria
Political parties established in 1933
Organizations based in Lagos
20th century in Lagos
Political parties in Lagos
Youth in Nigeria